The Westing Game  is a mystery book written by Ellen Raskin and published by Dutton on May 1, 1978. It won the Newbery Medal recognizing the year's most distinguished contribution to American children's literature.

The Westing Game was ranked number nine all-time among children's novels in a survey published by School Library Journal in 2012. It has been adapted as the 1997 feature film Get a Clue (also distributed as The Westing Game).

Plot summary
Sunset Towers is a new apartment building on Lake Michigan, north of Milwaukee and just down the shore from the mansion owned by reclusive self-made millionaire Samuel W. Westing. (Despite its name, Sunset Towers faces east – into the sunrise.) Sam Westing was a wealthy businessman who made his fortune in paper products. He was very patriotic and never smoked, drank, or gambled.

As the story opens, Barney Northrup is selling apartments to a carefully selected group of tenants. After Sam Westing dies, at the beginning of the book, it emerges that most of the tenants are named as heirs in Westing's will. The will is structured like a puzzle, with the 16 heirs challenged to find the solution. In the will it states that one of his heirs has taken his life. Each of the eight pairs, assigned seemingly at random, is given $10,000 cash and a different set of baffling clues. The pair that solves the mystery of his death will inherit Westing's entire $200 million fortune and control of his company.

Characters

Pair One
  Jake Wexler is a  podiatrist, and a bookie on the side. He is 45 years old and he is married to Grace Wexler, whom he loves, but he also knows that she might never be happy with their life or financial situation. Jake is the father of Angela Wexler and Tabitha-Ruth Wexler.
Madame Sun Lin Hoo is the second and much-younger Chinese immigrant wife of James Shin Hoo. She is 28 years old. She barely knows how to speak English. She can usually be found cooking in her husband's restaurant. There is a rumor going around Mr. Hoo married her because of her 100-year-old sauce recipe. Although she is an heir, she stole items around Sunset Towers and was planning on selling them so she can buy a trip back to China.

Pair Two
 Tabitha-Ruth "Turtle" Wexler, known as "Alice" to Flora Baumbach, is an intelligent 13-year-old girl. She is very protective of her long, dark braid of hair and anyone who touches it gets a kick to the shin. She excels at playing the stock market. She is very fond of Flora Baumbach, her partner in the game, and of Sandy McSouthers, the doorman. She has a sister named Angela Wexler, a mother named Grace Windkloppel Wexler and a father named Jake Wexler. Unknown to everyone else, she secretly wins the game by discovering the fourth identity of Windy Windkloppel/Sam Westing and is given control of his company. She visits him for chess every Sunday from then until his death at 85. It is discovered that she later marries Theo in the epilogue when Julian Eastman asks about her husband. After she turns 18, she requests that everyone call her "T.R. Wexler". She falsely admits to being the bomber after the fourth bomb explodes to protect her good-natured sister, Angela, who is the actual bomber.
 Flora Baumbach is a shy 60-year-old dressmaker who becomes a maternal figure to her partner, Turtle. Her daughter, Rosalie, had Down syndrome and died of pneumonia at age 19. Her husband disappeared, and it is unknown whether he died or if there was a divorce. Flora is kind to everyone and prefers to see the best in people. Turtle refers to her as "Baba," while she refers to Turtle as "Alice." Flora discovers that she is exceptional at braiding hair when she starts braiding Turtle's hair.

Pair Three
 Christos "Chris" Theodorakis is a 15-year-old boy who uses a wheelchair due to degenerative muscle disease. He is intelligent and enjoys birdwatching. His brother, Theo, is very protective of him. Chris's disease causes muscle spasms and affects his speech, but he is much more observant than he lets on – in part because he is often dismissed by others. Chris also develops a temporary friendship with Sydelle Pulaski. Denton Deere discovers a medication for Chris that helps with his condition. In the epilogue, Chris has a parrot named after him called the "something-Christos parrot", as said by Turtle. He is also shown in the epilogue to have a wife named Shirley. 
 Dr. Denton Deere is a 25-year-old medical intern. He is engaged to Angela. He has an obsession with diagnosing those he meets. He is very stuck up, and Turtle refers to him as a “know-it-all stuck up marshmallow face”. He is usually kicked by Turtle.

Pair Four
 Judge J.J. (Josie-Jo) Ford is an intelligent and serious African-American woman in her forties. She is suspicious of the game created by Sam Westing. Unlike the other heirs, who want to win the game and the fortune, her goal is to discover the past of every heir. She prefers to work on her own, but uses her partner's ear for gossip to her advantage. Her connection to Westing is that she is the daughter of his former servants and he financed her education. Growing up, Westing would play chess with Ford. As Sandy, Westing suggests that he did so as he saw her potential instead of pity as she believes.
 Alexander "Sandy" McSouthers was a 65-year-old doorman but is also Sam Westing, Barney Northrup, Julian R. Eastman, and Windy Windkloppel (as discovered at the end of the story). His description says that he previously worked at Westing Paper Products Corporation and claims to have been fired by Sam Westing himself for attempting to organize the workers. McSouthers is notable for his knowledge of Sunset Towers' gossip. He is exceptionally close to Turtle Wexler.

Pair Five
 Grace Windsor Wexler, married to Jake Wexler and mother of Angela and Turtle, is a self-centered woman who is obsessed with her own image. She is 42 years old. She favors Angela while largely ignoring Turtle. She claims to be Mr. Westing's niece; her name is actually Grace Windkloppel Wexler. Grace wants to be an interior designer. However, as the game goes on, she develops a growing interest in her partner's restaurant and  big the restaurant business in general.
 James Shin Hoo is an old-aged man, owner of the Hoo's restaurant and former entrepreneur, as well as Madame Hoo's husband and Doug's father. He claims Mr. Westing stole his patent for diapers and appears bitter and moody for this reason. He suffers from ulcers, and he can often be seen yelling at his son to study. He also often complains about how Doug is a "dummy’”and incredibly lazy.

Pair Six
 Berthe Erica Crow, usually referred to as simply Crow, is an extremely religious 57-year-old woman. She works as a cleaning woman for Sunset Towers, while also operating a downtown soup kitchen for the homeless called Good Salvation Soup Kitchen. She was the wife of Sam Westing and the answer to the game. Her pressuring led to the death of her and Westing's daughter, Violet, because she didn't want to marry the man she was betrothed to. She was accused of being the murderer.
 Otis Amber is a 62 year-old "delivery boy." Even outside of the game, he is often seen with Berthe Erica Crow, in part because he assists Crow with her soup kitchen. At the beginning of the story, he tells the tale of the gruesome bet that a boy once made involving the Westing mansion, which becomes an eerie theme throughout the book, using two words: "purple waves." Near the end, the heirs discover that he was a private investigator hired by Barney Northrup to investigate Judge J.J. Ford, George Theodorakis, James Hoo, Grace Windkloppel, Flora Baumbach, and Sybil (not Sydelle) Pulaski. He is discovered to have married Crow at the end.

Pair Seven
 Theo Theodorakis is a smart high school student, and very loyal to his family. He is protective of his brother Chris and works hard in his parents' coffee shop. He is interested in becoming a writer, and also becomes friends with his partner, Doug Hoo. He has a crush on Angela Wexler. However, in the epilogue, he finds Turtle "attractive" and is shown to have eventually married her.
 Doug Hoo, son of James Shin Hoo, is a high school track star, one of the best mile-runners in the state. Running is his passion, but his father often criticizes him for not studying enough. He is a prankster and develops a rivalry with Turtle Wexler because he often is pulling her braid and posting mocking notes about her, but he is very close to Theo.

Pair Eight
 Angela Wexler is a beautiful 20-year-old girl: fair, blonde, and very pretty. She is considered the 'perfect' daughter, often getting more attention than her sister Turtle. However, people only acknowledge her as an attractive object to be married to Dr. Denton Deere, and not an intelligent woman in her own right. After becoming a doctor herself, she does end up marrying Denton. She is the one who bombs the building; however, her sister takes the blame and tells her to keep the truth to herself. She was a victim of the third bomb.
 Sydelle Pulaski is 50 years old and is a mysterious character who seems to have no connection to Mr. Westing or the other heirs. No one pays any attention to her, so she tries hard to be noticed by faking an injury and walking with garishly painted wooden crutches. She seems to have an affinity for Chris Theodorakis. She is clever and observant, although these traits are often looked over. She is secretary to the president of Schultz's Sausages, Conrad Schultz, who later in the book is her fiancé. She was mistaken for Sybil Pulaski, a friend of Crow who was supposed to have been an heir instead. Sydelle keeps a shorthand notebook that contains the notes she took when the lawyer was reading the will. The reason she keeps a shorthand is because she is not one of the heirs. She finds out that her notebook is stolen by Madame Sun Lin Hoo, in order to pay to go back to China.

Other characters
 Barney Northrup is a mysterious figure who sells all of the apartments in Sunset Towers to the various heirs. At the beginning of the book, it is said he is a good businessman. After this, he is rarely seen by any of the tenants. Barney Northrup is also not a real person. (Sam Westing)
 Julian R. Eastman runs Westing Paper Products in Mr. Westing's absence. He was a witness to Mr. Westing's will. (Sam Westing). He is Windy Windkloppel's last identity and dies beside Turtle. (Sam Westing)
 Dr. Sidney Sikes is a good friend of Samuel W. Westing and a witness to his will. He was the one who declared both Westing and Sandy McSouthers (Sam Westing) dead and appears to be in on Westing's plan.
 Edgar Jennings Plum or E.J. Plum, is the young and fairly incompetent lawyer in charge of handling Samuel Westing's estate. Aside from reading Westing's will to the players, Plum has no part in the game. He is seen admiring Angela.
 George and Catherine Theodorakis run the Sunset Towers coffee shop.  They have no role in the game, even though George Theodorakis was Violet Westing's first love. Their sons Chris and Theo are heirs in the game. Victims of the first bomb, which exploded in their coffee shop.

Epilogue
The epilogue of the story is told in the book's last three chapters, which depict what happened to the heirs after the game ended, and how it affected them.

 Otis Amber and Crow fall in love and marry, leaving their jobs at Sunset Towers to work at Crow's soup kitchen, to which many of the heirs leave donations. Both died within a week of each other.
 Flora Baumbach leaves the dressmaking business a few years after the game's conclusion, moving in with Turtle and later becoming Alice's (Angela and Denton's daughter) nanny.
 Denton Deere and Angela Wexler both question their life choices and separate. Denton becomes a neurologist due to his success in treating Chris Theodorakis' disease, and Angela attends medical school to become a surgeon. Five years after the game's conclusion, the two are reunited, marry, and have a daughter named Alice.
 Judge Ford agrees to finance Chris' education in homage to her mentor, Sam Westing. She is appointed to the US Court of Appeals and later the Supreme Court.
 Sun Lin Hoo never leaves her husband and adopts the nickname "Sunny." She becomes fluent in English and becomes James' secretary in his new company. After he dies, she finally takes her trip to China but returns to take up the family business.
 James Hoo leaves the restaurant business and gives "Hoo's on First" to Grace. He patents his shoe-sole idea and becomes a multimillionaire, and moves out of Sunset Towers with his family. He dies briefly before the book's conclusion and is succeeded in the company by his wife.
 Doug Hoo wins his first Olympic gold medal and set a new record for the 1500-meter run shortly after the game ends, and goes on to win two more medals. Retiring from athletics, he becomes a popular sports announcer.
 Chris Theodorakis is ultimately able to manage the effects of his disease thanks to Denton's extensive research. However, he remains unable to walk and uses a wheelchair for the rest of his life. His college education is financed by Judge Ford, and he meets a girl named Shirley during his first year. He marries the latter and both become professors at the local university. Chris discovers and names a new species of parrot (Turtle describes it as the "something-Christos parrot") during an expedition in Central America.
 Sydelle Pulaski returns to her old job at Schultz Sausages and discovers that Mr. Schultz has a crush on her. She later marries him. The pair moves to Hawaii, though Sydelle stays in touch with Angela. She gives up using crutches to get attention but requires the use of them on various occasions near the end of the novel.
 Jake Wexler, dissatisfied with his job as a podiatrist, is recommended to a political position by Judge Ford. He becomes the Chairman of the State Gambling Commission and then the Wisconsin State Crime Commissioner, though the jobs give him little time to spend with his wife.
 Grace Wexler takes control of Jimmy Hoo's restaurant, renaming it "Hoo's on First" and giving it a theme of local sports stars. It gets rave reviews. The success of "Hoo's on First" ultimately results in a chain of ten such restaurants (Hoo's on First, Hoo's on Second, etc.), the latest of which allows her to work close to her husband in the state capital of Madison.
 Theo Theodorakis attends a literary college, becoming an assistant to the reporter who writes the article about Doug's first gold medal. He later becomes a novelist. His first novel does not sell well, but gets great reviews. At the book's end, he has almost finished his second book. Theo marries Turtle Wexler, though they agree not to have children lest the children inherit Chris' disease. Theo and Chris' parents move to Florida after retiring from their coffee shop business.
Turtle Wexler, having solved the game by discovering Sam Westing's secret life, is dedicated to becoming his successor – and, ultimately, the president of Westing Paper Products. She takes on the nickname of T.R. (real name: Tabitha-Ruth Wexler), attends college early, and makes over $5 million in the stock market. Turtle marries Theo Theodorakis and begins teaching Angela and Denton's daughter Alice how to play chess.
 Alexander "Sandy" McSouthers, who supposedly died after the game's conclusion, is revealed to be Samuel Westing, Barney Northrup, Windy Windkloppel, and (primarily) Julian Eastman. He becomes Turtle Wexler's mentor, pays for her expensive education, and plays chess with her every Sunday, although she tells people she is "at the library." He dies on the Fourth of July twenty years after the game is over.
Windy Windkloppel, director of The Westing Game and is also Sandy McSouthers, Julian R. Eastman, Barney Northrup, and Samuel Westing.

Other media
The Westing Game, adapted to a stage play by Darian Lindle and directed by Terry Brino-Dean, was first produced at Prime Stage Theatre in Pittsburgh in 2009. The script is published by Dramatic Publishing.

Get a Clue, adapted by Dylan Kelsey Hadley and directed by Terence H. Winkless, was produced for television in 1997.

It was announced on September 9, 2020 that HBO Max has placed a script-to-series order based on the book.

Reception
At the time of the book's publication, Kirkus Reviews called it "A supersharp mystery, more a puzzle than a novel, but endowed with a vivid and extensive cast... If Raskin's crazy ingenuity has threatened to run away with her on previous occasions, here the complicated game is always perfectly meshed with character and story. Confoundingly clever, and very funny." In a retrospective essay about the Newbery Medal-winning books from 1976 to 1985, literary critic Zena Sutherland wrote of The Westing Game, "Still a popular book with the group of readers who are mystery or puzzle fans, in retrospect this seems more entertaining than distinguished. Its choice as a Medal book underscores the problematic question: Can a distinguished book also be a popular book?"

References

External links

 The Westing Game manuscript online at UW Madison
 
 The Game learning guide, analysis, quotes, and teacher resources

1978 American novels
1978 children's books
American novels adapted into films
E. P. Dutton books
Newbery Medal–winning works
Novels by Ellen Raskin
Novels set in Milwaukee